Montlaux is a commune in the Alpes-de-Haute-Provence department in southeastern France.

It is a village peacefully situated on the edge of the Lauzon river, far from the main highways.

The village is unusual because it is very spread-out, contrary to most settlements in the area where the houses are clustered together with vast empty spaces on the outskirts.

Only in the small hamlet of Jacons will you find houses grouped together, along with the townhall and church.

Population

See also
Communes of the Alpes-de-Haute-Provence department

References
PROVENCE WEB

Communes of Alpes-de-Haute-Provence
Alpes-de-Haute-Provence communes articles needing translation from French Wikipedia